The 2019 Advance Auto Parts Clash was the 42nd edition of the Monster Energy NASCAR Cup Series race held on February 10, 2019, at Daytona International Speedway in Daytona Beach, Florida. Contested over 59 laps, shortened from 75 due to rain, it was the first exhibition race of the 2019 Monster Energy NASCAR Cup Series season.

Report

Background

The track, Daytona International Speedway, is one of six superspeedways to hold NASCAR races, the others being Michigan International Speedway, Auto Club Speedway, Indianapolis Motor Speedway, Pocono Raceway, and Talladega Superspeedway. The standard track at Daytona International Speedway is a four–turn superspeedway that is  The track's turns are banked at 31 degrees, while the front stretch, the location of the finish line, is banked at 18 degrees.

Format and eligibility
The race is 75 laps in length, and is divided into two segments; the first is 25 laps and the second is 50 laps. The race is open to those drivers who won a pole in the 2018 season or had won "The Clash" previously.

The 2019 Clash at Daytona will not be a predetermined number of cars; rather, the field is limited to drivers who meet more exclusive criteria. Only drivers who were 2018 Pole Award winners, former Clash race winners, former Daytona 500 champions, former Daytona 500 pole winners who competed full–time in 2018 and drivers who qualified for the 2018 Playoffs are eligible.

Entry list

Practice

Starting lineup
The lineup was determined by random draw, with Paul Menard drawing the top spot.

Race

The race, scheduled for 75 laps, was run in two segments, one of 25 laps and one of 50 laps.

Prior to the start, Chase Elliott and Denny Hamlin, both of whom were involved in practice incidents, were sent to the rear for backup cars.

Kyle Busch held the lead for the first lap before the Team Penske tandem of Paul Menard (in a satellite) and Brad Keselowski overtook him, holding the lead into the first safety car on Lap 8 for weather, resulting in a red flag of 21:31.  The race restarted on Lap 12 and the Penske dominance continued.  The strategy, similar to another Ford team (Stewart-Haas Racing) dominance at the previous Cup race at Talladega Superspeedway, continued until all but five cars pitted on Lap 25 to beat the competition caution safety car period.  Those five -- Austin Dillon, Alex Bowman, Jamie McMurray, Kevin Harvick, and Martin Truex, Jr. -- were the top five at the end of session break on Lap 26.  After the five non-pitting cars pitted under the safety car, the race restarted on Lap 33 with Menard continuing his dominance.

Rain struck again for the third safety car session, the second for rain, on Lap 40.  After another red flag session of 8:05, the race restarted on Lap 48.  Teams were warned of a longer rain cell that could end the race at any time, leading to a more aggressive race in the final laps, knowing that the race could end at any time.  With the weather, the fairly single-file high side racing moved to two-lane racing.

On Lap 56, the aggressive racing began.  Off a well-timed push from Hendrick Motorsports-affiliated driver Kurt Busch, Jimmie Johnson was able to pull up aside Menard.  Menard attempted the overtly aggressive "side draft" blocking maneuver to slow Johnson, but the two cars made contact.  With the field bunched, a massive pileup ensues, with Keselowski, Austin Dillon, Harvick, Ryan Newman, Elliott, Aric Almirola, Denny Hamlin, Clint Bowyer, Kyle Busch, Martin Truex, Jr., Erik Jones, McMurray, Kyle Larson, and Alex Bowman also involved.  Johnson and Busch were first and second when the safety car was called as a result of the Turn 3 crash.

The rains came while cleanup from this incident was taking place, and the race was called.  Johnson was declared the winner, his final NASCAR-sanctioned (but non-championship) race win.

Race results

Media
FS1 covered the race on the television side; Mike Joy, Darrell Waltrip, and Jeff Gordon handled the call in the booth for the race; Vince Welch and Matt Yocum handled pit road for the television side.

Television

Radio

References

2019 Monster Energy NASCAR Cup Series
2019 in sports in Florida
February 2019 sports events in the United States
NASCAR races at Daytona International Speedway